Sir James Martin  (11 September 1893 – 5 January 1981) was an Irish engineer who together with Captain Valentine Baker founded the Martin-Baker aircraft company which is now a leading producer of aircraft ejection seats.

Life
James Martin was born 11 September 1893 in Killinchy Woods (now Glasswater Road), Crossgar, County Down in Ireland. He established his own engineering firm in 1929.

In 1934, he and Valentine Baker formed Martin-Baker; Captain Baker took the test pilot role. It was in a crash of their third design, the MB 3, that Baker was killed.

In 1964 Martin was awarded the Gold Medal of the Royal Aero Club.

In 2004, Martin was inducted into the International Air & Space Hall of Fame at the San Diego Air & Space Museum.

Northern Bank
 
Martin's contribution to engineering was commemorated by the Northern Bank in its Inventor series of banknotes, which featured his portrait on the bank's £100 note. The note was discontinued in 2013 when the bank reissued its banknotes under the new Danske Bank brand.

Notes and references

External links 
 Sir James Martin at martin-baker.com

1893 births
1981 deaths
20th-century British inventors
British aerospace engineers
Irish inventors
Irish military engineers
English people of Irish descent
British people of Irish descent
Commanders of the Order of the British Empire
People from County Down
Knights Bachelor